California Poppies were a British speedway team based at Longmoor SpeedwayCalifornia in England, California Country Park, Nr Wokingham, Berkshire.

History
The California Poppies raced in the California Country Park in an area known as California in England at the time, the track was situated on the north west side of Longmoor Lake (51°22'54.3"N 0°52'35.4"W) in an area that formed part of Longmoor Bog and the track had a concrete starting grid.

They first raced in 1954 in the 1954 Southern Area League and were crowned champions. The following season in 1955, they finished runner-up to Rye House Roosters before they competed for one more league season in 1955, finishing 4th.

The team disbanded the following season with the promotion and nickname moving to Aldershot.

Season summary

See also
List of United Kingdom Speedway League Champions

References

Sport in Berkshire
Defunct British speedway teams